Giovanni Battista Cavagna, also known as Cavagni or Gavagni (c. 1545 in Rome – 1613) was an Italian architect, engineer, and painter mainly in Naples, but also in Rome and Ascoli Piceno, Italy.

Biography
In Naples, he worked in 1572–1577 at the church of San Gregorio Armeno together with Giovanni Vincenzo della Monica. He helped design the Bank in Naples, called the second Monte di Pietà, started in 1539 with goal, according to Sasso, of liberating citizens from the supposed usury of the Jews. By 1597, the building was completed and unified all the banks in the city. In this project, he was aided by Giovanni Giacomo Di Conforto and Giovanni Cola di Franco.

After leaving Naples for Rome, he worked in the studio of Federico Zuccari and performed numerous frescoes. He returned to Naples in 1590 to design several transition edifices from the Renaissance. For example, he helped complete the Muscettola chapel in the church of Santa Maria della Stella, now no longer extant. In 1591, he helped reconstruct the nave and apse of the church of Sant'Anna dei Lombardi. He also succeeded Francesco Grimaldi in the direction of the construction of San Paolo Maggiore.

From 1598 to 1599 he helped design the Cappella del Tesoro in the Basilica of the Santissima Annunziata Maggiore. In these years, he accused the foreign rival in Naples, Domenico Fontana, of selecting a poor site for construction the Royal Palace.

In 1601–1602, he was also entrusted the construction of the grain stores.  In 1607, he participated in a contest to design the Reale Cappella del Tesoro di San Gennaro, competing against Ceccardo Bernucci, Giulio Cesare Fontana, Francesco Grimaldi, Giovanni Cola di Franco, Michelangelo Naccherino, Dionisio Nencioni di Bartolomeo, and  Giovan Giacomo Di Conforto. The architects Grimaldi e Giovanni Cola di Franco submitted the winning design. In 1610, he was active in Ascoli Piceno, and provided designs for the oratorian church of San Pietro in Valle in the town of Fano in the Marche. He died and is buried in Loreto. Dionisio di Bartolomeo was one of his pupils.

It is unclear if there is an architect from Rome (died 1623) with the same name was involved in the renovation of Santa Caterina in Fabriano. He had been the architect of San Pietro in Valle, Fano and of the Sanctuary at Loreto.

Sources

Short biography 
Short biography

External links

1545 births
1613 deaths
17th-century Italian architects
16th-century Italian architects
16th-century Italian painters
Italian male painters
17th-century Italian painters
Painters from Naples
Engineers from Naples
16th-century Neapolitan people
Painters from Rome
Architects from Naples